HMAS Karangi was a Bar-class boom defence vessel operated by the Royal Australian Navy (RAN) during World War II. It was constructed by the Cockatoo Docks and Engineering Company at Cockatoo Island Dockyard, Sydney and launched on 16 August 1941. The vessel was awarded the battle honour "Darwin 1942–43" for her wartime service. In 1952, Karangi participated during the atomic tests at Monte Bello Islands.

She was sold on 8 September 1966 to L. Bookluck of Enmore and the superstructure was removed before the hulk was abandoned at Homebush Bay in 1970. The wreck is located at

Citations

References
 HMAS Karangi – Royal Australian Navy

1941 ships
Boom defence vessels of the Royal Australian Navy
Shipwrecks of the Sydney Eastern Suburbs Region